Dennis Şerban (born 5 January 1976 in Bucharest) is a Romanian retired football player.

Playing career
Şerban played for FC Farul Constanţa and Portul Constanţa (on loan) before joining the squad of Steaua București in 1996. A very talented playmaker, Şerban immediately became a very important part of the team which won the Romanian championship in 1997 and 1998 and played in the UEFA Champions League.

In 1999, he was signed by La Liga side Valencia CF. It normal conditions such a move would have been given wings to any player, however it was not Şerban's case, unfortunately. From a man used game after game by Steaua București he became an unused substitute at Valencia and that damaged his career.

After two years at Valencia in which he only played 11 games, Şerban is loaned to Villarreal CF, in Spain's La Liga, and from there to Elche CF. At Elche he had a good period, playing 35 games and scoring 11 goals during the full season, and as a result he is called back by Valencia CF only to be released after few weeks and sent to Rapid Bucharest.

In 2002, he returned to Spain to play for Córdoba CF and then Polideportivo Ejido but as soon as he was released by Valencia CF from his contract, he returned to Romania to join Petrolul Ploieşti and then Dinamo Bucharest.

January 2005 found Şerban playing for Larissa in the Greek second division. His club won promotion and, in 2006, he continued playing for Larissa, in the Greek first division, having a productive year with 27 appearances and 1 goal.

In August 2006, Şerban was signed again by Dinamo Bucharest. He was dismissed by coach Mircea Rednic in the early days of February 2007. Shortly after this, he started coaching Astra Ploiești and later Farul Constanţa.

International career
Şerban won 13 caps for the Romania national side, scoring once in a 2–1 win over Yugoslavia.

International goals

Honours

Club 
Steaua București
Romanian League (2): 1996–97, 1997–98 
Romanian Cup (1): 1996–97
Romanian Supercup (1): 1998

Valencia
Spanish Cup (1): 1998–99

Rapid București
Romanian Cup (1): 2001–02

References

External links

1976 births
Living people
Footballers from Bucharest
Romanian footballers
Romania international footballers
Romanian expatriate footballers
FCV Farul Constanța players
CS Portul Constanța players
FC Steaua București players
FC Dinamo București players
FC Rapid București players
FC Petrolul Ploiești players
Association football midfielders
La Liga players
Segunda División players
Super League Greece players
Expatriate footballers in Spain
Expatriate footballers in Greece
Valencia CF players
Villarreal CF players
Elche CF players
Córdoba CF players
Polideportivo Ejido footballers
Athlitiki Enosi Larissa F.C. players
FC Progresul București managers
FC Astra Giurgiu managers
Romanian expatriate sportspeople in Spain
Romanian expatriate sportspeople in Greece
Romanian football managers